John Kevin Stitt (born December 28, 1972) is an American businessman and politician serving as the 28th governor of Oklahoma since 2019. A member of the Republican Party, he was elected in 2018, defeating Democrat and former state Attorney General Drew Edmondson with 54.3% of the vote. Stitt was reelected to a second term in 2022, defeating Superintendent of Public Instruction Joy Hofmeister, a Republican turned Democrat, with 55.4% of the vote. A member of the Cherokee Nation, Stitt is the second governor of Native descent after former Oklahoma governor Johnston Murray.

Stitt grew up in Norman, Oklahoma, and graduated from Oklahoma State University with a degree in accounting. He is the founder and former chairman and CEO of Gateway Mortgage Group.

Early life
Kevin Stitt was born in Milton, Florida, on December 28, 1972. His family moved to Skiatook, Oklahoma, when he was five. He began school in Wayne, Oklahoma and the family later moved to Norman, Oklahoma, where his father was the pastor of Riverside Church. He graduated from Norman High School and from Oklahoma State University with a degree in accounting. Stitt helped pay his way through college by selling educational products door-to-door for Southwestern Advantage. He was the first person in the company's 115-year history to achieve the top sales as a first-year salesperson. Stitt is a member of the Beta Theta Pi fraternity.

Financial services career
Stitt worked in the financial services sector before starting Gateway in 2000. He founded the company and was president and CEO until January 2014, when he became chairman-CEO. Stitt has said he started Gateway in 2000 with "$1,000 and a computer." His first obstacle was to get approved as a Federal Housing Administration (FHA) lender, for which the company needed a net worth of $50,000. To achieve that, Stitt put forward the equity in his home. In 2002, Gateway secured its first warehouse line, began obtaining licensing in states other than Oklahoma, and started recruiting loan officers. By 2006, it had over 400 employees.

In August 2018, after winning the Republican nomination, Stitt stepped down as Gateway CEO as the company announced a merger with a state-licensed bank and sought its banking license. Legal Counsel Scott Gesell became CEO in 2020 and Stitt remained chairman. Gateway is a midsize company based in Jenks, Oklahoma. It employs more than 1,500 people and originates mortgages in 42 states.

Gateway Mortgage license
After a decade of rapid growth, a few Gateway employees were fired for making non-compliant loans. In 2009, Gateway was listed in a Business Insider article as one of the 15 shadiest lenders in the government-backed mortgage industry. The article said Gateway originated nearly twice as many bad mortgages as its competitors. An August 19, 2018, Oklahoman newspaper article highlighted the Business Insider article's inaccuracies, reporting that "in the Illinois case, a consent order states that the Illinois banking agency investigated a Gateway loan originator for an 'alleged real estate, appraisal, and mortgage fraud scheme.' Gateway fired the employee, asked for a hearing and then agreed to what investigators found. Gateway agreed to a $10,000 fine. The Stitt campaign responded with a press release that said, "the license in Illinois was never revoked. The state agreed after the appeal not to revoke the license."

NEWS9 also said that according to Georgia's Department of Banking and Finance, Stitt was banned for five years and the company was banned for life from origination mortgages in Georgia. According to the Oklahoman, a Gateway corporate attorney said there were misrepresentations and insufficient background checks by employees in the Georgia office but Stitt was not involved. The employees were fired and Gateway paid a $2,000 fine. The state overturned the lifetime ban on Gateway, effective November 2017. Gateway is able to do business in all 50 states.

During Stitt's gubernatorial campaign, Oklahoma Watch reported that Wisconsin regulators fined Gateway for a "clerical error" regarding its history with regulators from other states. Gateway corrected the application and was issued a license in 2009. It remains in good standing in Wisconsin.

Governor of Oklahoma

2018 election

In July 2017, Stitt announced his candidacy for the Republican nomination for governor in 2018. Facing nine other candidates in the primary election, he ran a statewide campaign with stops in nearly every city and town in all 77 counties. He finished second, defeating, among others, Lieutenant Governor Todd Lamb. In the August 28 primary runoff, Stitt defeated Mick Cornett, a former mayor of Oklahoma City. In the November general election, Stitt defeated the Democratic nominee, former Attorney General Drew Edmondson, and Libertarian Chris Powell.

In the GOP runoff, political newcomer Stitt received crucial support from a trio of conservative leaders such as U.S. Senator Ted Cruz and former U.S. Senators Rick Santorum and Tom Coburn all of whom endorsed him. In the general election, Stitt was endorsed by former primary rival Mick Cornett, the incumbent governor of Oklahoma, Mary Fallin, and President Donald Trump. The Stitt campaign promptly rejected Fallin's endorsement with a press release: "We did not seek [Fallin's endorsement], and Kevin Stitt has run on a campaign message that he will do things a lot differently. He is focused on changing the structure of state government and cleaning up the mess we are currently in at the Capitol."

During his campaign, Stitt called himself "the only job creator with proven business experience" running for governor and emphasized his business background. He called on the state to become "top 10 in job growth, top 10 in education and top 10 in infrastructure."

During the general election, the close race drew increased attention from national media and political figures. Vice President Mike Pence campaigned for Stitt.

2022 election

Stitt filed to run for reelection in January 2021. He won the Republican primary in June 2022 and was reelected to a second term in November.

Tenure
Stitt was inaugurated on January 14, 2019, at the Oklahoma State Capitol. Chief Justice of Oklahoma Noma Gurich swore him and Lieutenant Governor Matt Pinnell into office. Stitt then gave a 15-minute inaugural address.

Administration personnel

Cabinet positions

Before taking office, Stitt nominated former state Representative Michael Rogers as his Secretary of State and Tulsa Deputy Mayor Michael Junk (a former advisor to U.S. Senators Jim Inhofe and Tom Coburn) as his chief of staff.

On December 23, 2019, citing disagreements with Stitt over his handling of negotiations with the state's various Indian tribes about gambling compacts, Lisa Johnson Billy became the first member of the Stitt's cabinet to resign. A member of the Chickasaw Nation and former Republican state representative, Billy viewed Stitt's negotiation position as one of "unnecessary conflict." Stitt tapped his Secretary of State Mike Rogers to assume those duties and temporarily combined the two positions.

Cabinet confirmation process

Sub-Cabinet officials

Abortion
In April 2022, Stitt supported, and signed into law, SB 612, which makes performing an abortion a crime punishable by 10 years in prison or a $100,000 fine, with exceptions for medical emergencies but none for rape or incest. The law will come into effect in summer 2022 unless blocked by a court ruling. Later in May, Stitt signed into law an even more restrictive bill, House Bill 4327, "banning abortions from the stage of 'fertilization' and allowing private citizens to sue abortion providers who 'knowingly' perform or induce an abortion 'on a pregnant woman.'" Abortion in cases of rape, incest, or high-risk pregnancies will continue to be permitted. It is the most restrictive ban on elective abortion in the United States. The ACLU announced that it would fight the ban in court.

Capital punishment
Oklahoma has a long history with capital punishment, having conducted the second-most executions since the death penalty was reinstated in Gregg v. Georgia (1976). But in 2015, a moratorium was placed on all state executions following the botched execution of Clayton Lockett in April 2014 and the execution of Charles Warner by unauthorized methods in January 2015. On February 13, 2020, Stitt announced that the moratorium would be lifted and executions resumed under his tenure. On November 18, 2021, he commuted the death sentence of Julius Jones to life without the possibility of parole.

Criminal justice and mass incarceration

Oklahoma Pardon and Parole Board 
Three of the five Oklahoma Pardon and Parole Board members are appointed by the governor. They serve four year terms that run concurrent with the governor's. Before Adam Luck and Kelley Doyle were pressured to resign from the Board in 2022, Stitt had expressed full confidence in the board over criticisms from District Attorneys like Steve Kunzweiler who want the board to be more conservative in their considerations for parole and commutation. The Tulsa World reported that the District Attorneys were taking an increasingly more political role that has "to some degree weakened" the board's influence. This came at the same time that dark money conservative advertisements targeting Stitt as not tough enough on crime began to air. All of this plays out despite Oklahoma incarcerating a "higher percentage of its people than any democracy on earth." According to Prison Policy Initiative, Oklahoma had the third-highest incarceration rate in 2021, and in 2018, it incarcerated the most women per capita.

In 2022, Stitt at first agreed to grant parole to Jimmie Stohler after a recommendation from the Oklahoma Pardon and Parole Board, the Crossbow Killer, but later rescinded his decision.

Findings in a 2022 grand jury report filed by David Prater criticized Stitt for being grossly improper, claimed that he pressured the Oklahoma Pardon and Parole Board, and that his private meetings seem to have violated the Open Meetings Act. DAs have the ability to bring grand juries. When the report came out, Stitt's office issued a statement saying, "This is the latest in a string of unfounded hit jobs by the Oklahoma County District Attorney and other political insiders." A spokesman for Stitt said, "Oklahoma law explicitly prohibits grand juries from making allegations that public officials have engaged in misconduct, and it is clear the outgoing prosecutor took advantage of the citizens who served on this grand jury to unwittingly carry out his partisan feud against Governor Stitt and the Pardon and Parole Board." The report noted that the jury "had no legal authority to accuse the governor of official misconduct, which can only be done in impeachment proceedings." Later, Stitt "asked a judge to strike from a grand jury report a finding that he placed 'improper political pressure' on his appointees to the Oklahoma Pardon and Parole Board."

Legislation 
Stitt attempted to address the state's overincarceration crisis. Beginning with the adoption of State Question 780 by Oklahoma voters in 2016, advocates for criminal justice reform sought additional measures. SQ780, which changed the classification of simple drug possession crimes from felony to misdemeanor and increased the cap for property crimes to be considered felonies, had already reduced the rate of felony prosecution statewide by 26% by 2018. In May 2019, Stitt proposed several ideas, including making SQ780's sentencing standards retroactive, prohibiting criminal records from being considered for professional licensing, and restructuring the funding scheme for the various district attorney offices. The legislature made SQ780 retroactive by allowing parole for those convicted before SQ780 became effective and reforming professional licensing, but did not approve bills to reform Oklahoma's cash bail system. In response to legislative defeats, Stitt issued an executive order to form a study group to make recommendations for future criminal justice reform for consideration during the 2020 legislative session, with particular emphasis on reducing Oklahoma's incarceration rate.

In mid-2018, Oklahoma voters approved State Question 788, which legalized the licensed use, sale, and growth of marijuana for medical purposes. As a candidate, Stitt cited a need to implement the results of the election by enacting a comprehensive regulatory scheme. After months of negotiation with legislative leaders, Stitt signed HB2612, the Oklahoma Medical Marijuana and Patient Protection Act. Also known as the "Marijuana Unity Bill", HB2612 provided an extensive medical marijuana framework, including licensing requirements and rights for patients.

Culture war
On May 7, 2021, Stitt signed a bill prohibiting the teaching of critical race theory or its gender equivalent in public schools. The Oklahoman wrote that it was unclear whether critical race theory was taught at any Oklahoma public schools. Opponents of the bill said it was intended to discourage nuanced discussions about race and whitewash the United States' history on race. Stitt invoked Martin Luther King Jr. when he signed the bill.

In November, Stitt issued an executive order that prohibited transgender individuals from changing the gender on their birth certificates. In 2022, Stitt signed a bill into law that prohibited nonbinary gender markers on birth certificates. Stitt said that "people are created by God to be male or female. There is no such thing as nonbinary sex." Transgender people criticized Stitt's actions, saying it was difficult for trans individuals to navigate life when their official documents do not match their gender identity. According to the American Medical Association, "empirical evidence has demonstrated that trans and nonbinary gender identities are normal variations of human identity and expression."

On May 25, 2022, Stitt signed a bill into law that will require students at public charter schools and public schools to use locker rooms and bathrooms that match the sex listed on their birth certificate.

Government reform
In his first state of the state address, Stitt called for increased appointment power over major state agencies. The legislature granted his request by adopting five new laws, giving him direct control over the Oklahoma Department of Corrections, the Oklahoma Health Care Authority, the Oklahoma Department of Transportation, the Oklahoma Office of Juvenile Affairs, and the Oklahoma Department of Mental Health and Substance Abuse Services. These agencies were previously under the control of multi-member boards or commissions that acted independently of the governor.

In exchange for additional appointment powers and at legislative leaders' request, Stitt signed into law SB1, which established the Oklahoma Legislative Office of Fiscal Transparency in the legislative branch. Under the direction of an oversight committee composed of members of the State Senate and House of Representatives, the office will provide auditing, evaluation, and investigative services for the legislature relating to the governor's proposed budget and expenditures by the executive branch.

Guns
The first law Stitt signed after taking office permitted anyone 21 or older, or 18 if a member or veteran of the United States Armed Forces, to carry a firearm without obtaining a permit or completing training. Stitt also signed HB2010, which expands the places a firearm may be carried to include municipal zoos and parks, regardless of size, as long as it is concealed.

Healthcare
Stitt opposes Medicaid expansion in Oklahoma. His refusal to expand the program resulted in the filing of an citizens' initiative petition, State Question 802, to enact the expansion into the state constitution notwithstanding Stitt's opposition.

Tribal relations
Under the authority of the federal Indian Gaming Regulatory Act, in 2004 Oklahoma voters approved State Question 712, which adopted the Oklahoma State-Tribal Gaming Act. Under the Act, the State of Oklahoma offers each federally recognized Indian tribe the right to conduct commercial gambling within its territory upon accepting the terms of a uniform state-tribal gaming compact. The compact allowed the compacting tribes to conduct gaming in return for "exclusivity fees" to the state treasury averaging 6% of gaming revenues. The compact was scheduled to automatically renew on January 1, 2020.

In a July 2019 op-ed in the Tulsa World followed by a letter to the chiefs of 35 Oklahoma tribes, Stitt called on tribal leaders to renegotiate the terms of the compact before its expiration date. In particular, he called for increasing the exclusivity fees to between 13% and 25%. Stitt's office maintained the compact is not subject to automatic renewal, a claim the tribes rejected, believing it will continue indefinitely unless changes are mutually agreed upon. In either event, the Oklahoma Legislature would presumably have to be involved in any renegotiation, since the state's compact offer is defined and controlled by state statute, and federal law requires that the United States Department of the Interior approve any new compact terms.

In August 2019, the various tribes refused to meet with Stitt to negotiate the amount of the exclusivity fees unless he conceded that the compact would otherwise automatically renew. Stitt had proposed a September 3 date to begin discussions but the tribes rejected it.

At the end of December 2019, the Choctaw, Cherokee, and Chickasaw tribes filed suit in the United States District Court for the Western District of Oklahoma to end the dispute over the compact. On December 31, Stitt signed an extension to the hunting and fishing license compact with the Choctaw Nation, a previous point of contention.

On July 28, 2020, U.S. District Judge Timothy D. DeGiusti ruled in the tribes' favor, holding that their compacts with the state automatically renewed for an additional 15-year term on January 1, 2020. A week earlier, on July 21, the Oklahoma Supreme Court ruled that the new gaming compacts signed by the state and the Comanche Nation and the Otoe-Missouria Tribe are invalid under state law. The Court ruled that Stitt "exceeded his authorities" in entering into the compacts because they would have allowed gaming that is illegal in Oklahoma, like sports betting.

On July 9, 2020, the United States Supreme Court decided in McGirt v. Oklahoma that half of the land of the state of Oklahoma made up of tribal nations like the Cherokee are officially Native American tribal land jurisdictions. Stitt, a Cherokee Nation citizen, sought to reverse the Supreme Court decision, but in 2021 Oklahoma could not block the federal action to grant the Cherokee Nation along with the Chickasaw, Choctaw, Muscogee (Creek) and Seminole Nations reservation status.

Response to coronavirus outbreak 
In March 2020, Stitt went out to restaurants amid the coronavirus pandemic and posted a photo on Twitter of him doing so with two of his children. He later deleted the tweet, and his spokesperson said, "the governor will continue to take his family out to dinner and to the grocery store without living in fear and encourages Oklahomans to do the same." President Trump said he did not advocate going out to eat but did not criticize Stitt. In the tweet, Stitt wrote, "Eating with my kids and all my fellow Oklahomans ... It's packed tonight!" The photograph he posted with his kids showed them smiling while surrounded by restaurant patrons. On June 20, Stitt attended the Trump rally in Tulsa, and was seen without wearing a mask. On July 15, Stitt announced that he had tested positive for COVID-19. He was the first United States governor diagnosed with COVID-19.

In April 2020, Stitt ordered a massive purchase of hydroxychloroquine, a drug of unproven efficacy as a treatment against the coronavirus but which had been heavily promoted by Donald Trump and his allies. By January 2021, Oklahoma had a $2 million stockpile of hydroxychloroquine which it sought to offload.

On July 30, 2021, Oklahoma Watch released a review of Stitt's Twitter since he received the COVID-19 vaccine and found he posted the least on social media to encourage vaccination of all the governors of states surrounding Oklahoma, including Colorado, Kansas, Missouri, Arkansas, Texas, and New Mexico. Only 1.53%, or 3 out of 193, of Stitt's tweets encouraged COVID-19 vaccination. It also found that Stitt had not used his Facebook account to encourage vaccination in months and that none of his last 45 press releases were about vaccination, at a time when Oklahoma had one of the highest COVID-19 test positivity rates in the country.

Stitt sent U.S. Defense Secretary Lloyd Austin a letter requesting that COVID-19 vaccine requirements for the Oklahoma National Guard be suspended. Stitt subsequently fired the commander of the Oklahoma National Guard because the commander had advocated for his troops to be vaccinated. Stitt's new appointee refused to implement the COVID-19 vaccine requirements.

Sports betting
In January 2023, Stitt announced his support for legalizing sports betting in Oklahoma after Representative Ken Luttrell filed a bill to allow federally recognized tribes in the state to offer sports betting.

Judicial reform and appointments
Stitt signed legislation reorganizing the Oklahoma Supreme Court and the Oklahoma Court of Civil Appeals. Before the reforms, Supreme Court justices were appointed from nine separate districts representing various collections of counties. Under the legislation, as of 2020 the Court's nine judicial districts were redrawn such that five were made coequal with the state's five congressional districts and the other four are at large with the state as whole. Similarly, the five judicial districts used to appoint judges to the Court of Criminal Appeals were made coequal with the congressional districts. The legislation left the method for appointing appellate judges via the Oklahoma Judicial Nominating Commission unchanged. The reform's ostensible purpose was to increase the pool of applicants to the appellate courts.

The governor of Oklahoma is responsible for making appointments to Oklahoma state courts upon a vacancy. Candidates for appointment are reviewed by the Oklahoma Judicial Nominating Commission, which forwards three names to the governor. The governor appoints one of the three without further confirmation. As of 2020, there are 29 appellate court judges (nine Supreme Court justices, five Court of Criminal Appeals judge, 12 Court of Civil Appeals judges, and three Court of Military Appeals judges) and 156 trial judges (75 district judges, 77 associate district judges, and four Workers Compensation Court judges) subject to the gubernatorial appointment process.

Appellate courts

Trial courts

Personal life

Stitt is a citizen of the Cherokee Nation through his great-grandfather, Robert Benton Dawson. Dawson was given land in the Skiatook area because of his tribal citizenship, and the land is still in the family, now owned by an uncle of Stitt's. The legitimacy of his Cherokee ancestry has been questioned due to the Cherokee Nation's failed attempt to remove Robert Benton Dawson from the Dawes Rolls around 1900 for allegedly bribing an official to be included in the roll, but the current Cherokee Nation does not dispute Stitt's citizenship. Stitt's maternal grandparents were dairy farmers in Skiatook. His paternal grandfather was the head veterinarian at the Oklahoma City Stockyards.

Stitt married Sarah Hazen in 1998 and they have six children. The Stitts are active with the Woodlake Church, an Assemblies of God USA church in Tulsa. On October 31, 2022, Stitt's 20-year-old son was found intoxicated in a parking lot in Guthrie, Oklahoma, in possession of firearms, including a gun belonging to his father. No charges were filed, though the Logan County Sheriff's Office recommended filing charges.

Electoral history

See also
List of minority governors and lieutenant governors in the United States

References

External links

 Governor Kevin Stitt official government website
 
 
 Kevin Stitt at On the Issues

|-

|-

|-

|-

1972 births
American Protestant missionaries
Businesspeople from Oklahoma
Cherokee Nation businesspeople
Republican Party governors of Oklahoma
Living people
Oklahoma State University alumni
Native American Christians
Native American state governors of the United States
People from Norman, Oklahoma
People from Tulsa, Oklahoma
Protestant missionaries in Nigeria
21st-century American businesspeople
21st-century American politicians
American gun rights activists
People from Milton, Florida
20th-century Native Americans
21st-century Native Americans